Wait and See is a live album by pianist Duke Jordan's Trio recorded at the Tivolis Koncertsal and first released on the Danish SteepleChase label in 1985.

Reception

AllMusic reviewer Scott Yanow stated "Another excellent bop-oriented Duke Jordan session, one of many for SteepleChase".

Track listing
All compositions by Duke Jordan except as indicated
 "Love Train" - 7:28
 "Misty" (Johnny Burke, Erroll Garner) - 7:28
 "My Heart Skips a Beat" - 7:20
 "Dancer's Call" - 7:39 Bonus track on CD reissue
 "The Bullet" - 6:30 Bonus track on CD reissue
 "Undecided Lady" - 6:13
 "Wait and See" - 4:31
 "Out of Nowhere" (Johnny Green, Edward Heyman) - 6:41
 "Jordu" - 2:10

Personnel
Duke Jordan - piano
Wilbur Little - bass 
Dannie Richmond - drums

References

1985 live albums
Duke Jordan live albums
SteepleChase Records live albums